Masimo Corporation is a global medical technology company that develops, manufactures, and markets a variety of noninvasive patient monitoring technologies, hospital automation solutions, home monitoring devices, ventilation solutions, and consumer products. Masimo is based in Irvine, California. The company's core measurement technologies are pulse oximetry, alongside advanced Pulse CO-Oximetry measurements, brain function monitoring, regional oximetry, acoustic respiration rate monitoring, capnography, nasal high-flow respiratory support therapy, patient position and activity tracking, and neuromodulation technology for the reduction of symptoms associated with opioid withdrawal. Masimo was founded in 1989 by electrical engineer Joe Kiani, who was later joined by fellow engineer Mohamed Diab.

Masimo went public in 2007 and is currently traded on the Nasdaq stock exchange under the symbol MASI. In 2011, Forbes named Masimo to its list of top 20 public companies under a billion dollars in revenue.

In March 2020, to support efforts to combat COVID-19, Masimo announced a number of noninvasive monitoring and single-patient-use solutions to help care teams manage the surge in patients, including Masimo SafetyNet.

In 2022, Masimo acquired Sound United, which owns premium audio brands such as Bowers & Wilkins, Denon, Marantz, Definitive Technology, Polk Audio, Classé and Boston Acoustics.

Technology

Signal Extraction Technology (SET) pulse oximetry

Pulse oximetry uses two light emitting diodes (LEDs), one red and one infrared, to measure the absorption of light and translates that into the percentage of hemoglobin molecules that are bound to oxygen, which is called arterial oxygen saturation (SpO2). Conventional pulse oximetry assumes that arterial blood is the only blood moving (pulsating) in the measurement site. However, during patient motion, the venous blood also moves, which can cause conventional pulse oximetry to under-read SpO2 levels because it cannot distinguish between the arterial and venous blood.

SET identifies the venous blood signal (which has a lower oxygen saturation level than arterial blood), isolates it, and uses adaptive filters to extract the arterial signal in order to report accurate SpO2 and pulse rate. In addition, SET pulse oximetry provides perfusion index (PI) and pleth variability index (PVI). Multiple studies have shown that compared to non-SET pulse oximeters, SET increases the ability to detect life-threatening events and reduces false alarms. Additional studies have also shown the impact of SET on patient outcomes, such as helping clinicians:

 Decrease retinopathy of prematurity (ROP) in neonates
 Increase detection of critical congenital heart disease (CCHD) in newborns
 Reduce ventilator weaning time by titrating FiO2 faster and reduce arterial blood gas measurements in the Intensive Care Unit (ICU)
 Decrease rapid response activations and Intensive Care Unit (ICU) transfers through earlier identification of patients in distress through low SpO2 and abnormal pulse rate measurements
 Decrease fluid administered during surgery and reduce patient risk  
In 2011, the American Academy of Pediatrics and the U.S. Department of Health and Human Services recommended mandatory screening for all newborns, using "motion-tolerant pulse oximeters that report functional oxygen saturation have been validated in low perfusion conditions". To make this recommendation, the CCHD workgroup relied on two independent studies that exclusively used SET pulse oximetry to assess newborns. In 2012, Masimo received FDA 510(k) clearance for devices and sensors with labeling for screening newborns for CCHD. It marked the first time the FDA cleared specific labeling indicating the use of pulse oximeters, in conjunction with a physical examination, to screen newborns for CCHD.

In 2012, the National Health Service (NHS) Technology Adoption Centre in the United Kingdom advised hospitals to use Intraoperative Fluid Management, and included Masimo's PVI among technologies available for helping clinicians manage fluid during surgeries. In 2013, the French Society for Anaesthesia and Intensive Care (SFAR) added PVI to its guidelines for optimal hemodynamic management of surgical patients.

rainbow Pulse CO-Oximetry 
rainbow Pulse CO-Oximetry uses more than seven wavelengths of light to continuously and noninvasively measure hemoglobin (SpHb), carboxyhemoglobin (SpCO), and methemoglobin (SpMet), in addition to oxygen saturation (SpO2), pulse rate, perfusion index (Pi), and pleth variability index (PVi). A study at Massachusetts General Hospital showed that SpHb monitoring helped clinicians decrease the frequency of patients receiving blood transfusions during surgery from 4.5% to 0.6%. Another study from Cairo University showed that SpHb monitoring helped clinicians reduce blood transfusions in high blood loss surgery by an average of 0.9 units per patient. Emergency department studies have shown that SpCO helps clinicians increase the detection of carbon monoxide (CO) poisoning and decreases the time to treatment compared to invasive methods. The Pronto-7 device for noninvasive spot checking of hemoglobin, along with SpO2 and pulse rate, has been recognized with a gold Medical Design Excellence Award. The World Health Organization called noninvasive hemoglobin an "innovative medical technology for cost-effectively addressing global health concerns and needs".

In October 2014, Masimo announced CE Marking of Oxygen Reserve Index or ORi, the company's 11th noninvasive parameter, which provides real-time visibility to oxygenation status. ORi is intended to supplement, not replace, oxygen saturation (SpO2) monitoring and partial pressure of oxygen (PaO2) measurements. ORi can be trended and has optional alarms to notify clinicians of changes in a patient's oxygen reserve, and may enable proactive interventions to avoid hypoxia and unintended hyperoxia.

Patient and consumer monitoring

Patient SafetyNet
Patient SafetyNet is a remote monitoring and notification system designed for patients on medical/surgical care floors. A large study by Dartmouth-Hitchcock Medical Center showed Patient SafetyNet helped clinicians achieve a 65% reduction in distress codes and rescue activations and a 48% decrease in patient transfers to intensive care units (ICU), yielding a savings of 135 Intensive Care Unit (ICU) days annually for an annual opportunity-cost savings of $1.48 million. In 2020, Dartmouth-Hitchcock published a retrospective study showing that over ten years of using Patient SafetyNet, there were zero patient deaths and no patients were harmed by opioid-induced respiratory depression while continuous monitoring with Masimo SET was in use. ECRI Institute gave Dartmouth its Health Devices Achievement Award for its use of Patient SafetyNet to prevent "severe patient harm". Masimo has introduced Halo ION in the Patient SafetyNet system, combining multiple physiologic parameters into one number to help clinicians assess overall patient status.

Rainbow acoustic monitoring
Rainbow acoustic monitoring provides noninvasive and continuous measurement of respiration rate using an adhesive sensor with an integrated acoustic transducer that is applied to the patient's neck. Researchers have evaluated acoustic respiration rate (RRa) and found the acceptable accuracy and significantly fewer false alarms than traditional respiration rate monitoring methods, end-tidal carbon dioxide (EtCO2) and impedance pneumography.

SedLine brain function monitoring
In 2010, Masimo began offering brain function monitoring to measure the effects of anesthesia and sedation by monitoring both sides of the brain's electrical activity (EEG). Studies have shown this results in more individualized titration and improved care.

Capnography and gas monitoring
In 2012, Masimo began offering ultra-compact mainstream and sidestream capnography as well as multigas analyzers for end-tidal carbon dioxide (CO2), nitrous oxide (N2O), oxygen (O2), and anesthetic agents, for use in the operating room, procedural sedation, and in intensive care units (ICU). A multi-center study at Cincinnati Children's Hospital Medical Center, University Medical Center (Tucson, Arizona), and Children's Medical Center (Dallas), found that respiratory rate measured from noninvasive, acoustic monitoring had similar accuracy and precision as nasal capnography, the current standard of care when used in pediatric patients.

Masimo SafetyNet 
In 2020, in response to the COVID-19 pandemic, Masimo introduced Masimo SafetyNet for the smartphone. In addition to helping combat COVID-19, Masimo SafetyNet can also be configured to help clinicians create, relay, and manage treatment plans for more than 150 other health needs.

Bridge 
In 2020, Masimo also introduced Bridge, a drug-free, non-surgical device that uses neuromodulation to aid in the reduction of symptoms associated with opioid withdrawal.

W1 
In 2022, Masimo announced the W1 health watch for consumers.

References

External links
 

Companies listed on the Nasdaq
Medical device manufacturers
Companies based in Irvine, California
Medical technology companies of the United States
Health care companies based in California
Manufacturing companies based in Greater Los Angeles
Manufacturing companies established in 1989
Health care companies established in 1989
2007 initial public offerings
1989 establishments in the United States
1989 establishments in California
Companies established in 1989